The 2010 Oakland Raiders season was the team's 41st season in the National Football League and their 51st overall. It also marked the last full season under the ownership of Al Davis, who died in October 2011. The Raiders had improved from a five-win season, their first since 2002, and achieved their first non-losing season since losing Super Bowl XXXVII on January 26, 2003. However, the team missed the playoffs for the eighth consecutive season. The Raiders picked 8th in the 2010 NFL Draft. There were no blacked-out home games after the early part of the season and the team won all six of their division matches, including a franchise-record 59 points in Denver. The Raiders became the first team in NFL history to go undefeated in their division and still not make the playoffs.

The season was notable not only because the Raiders swept their division, but every victory came against a rival. The Raiders recorded home victories against the Seahawks, their former division foes from 1977 to 2001, and the Rams, whom the Raiders used to have a rivalry with during their time in Los Angeles from 1982 to 1994.

Offseason

Draft

After finishing the 2009 season with a record of 5–11, the Raiders got the 8th overall pick in the 2010 NFL Draft.  They had an additional third round pick acquired in a trade with the New England Patriots for defensive end Derrick Burgess.  Their sixth round pick was traded to the Carolina Panthers as part of a deal that gave the Raiders a seventh round pick in the 2009 NFL Draft.

Staff

Final roster

Schedule

Preseason

Regular season

Standings

Preseason results
Preseason Week 1 – at Dallas Cowboys

'Preseason Week 2 – at Chicago Bears

Regular season results

Week 1: at Tennessee Titans

The Raiders began their season at LP Field against the Tennessee Titans.  In the first quarter, Oakland got the opening strike as kicker Sebastian Janikowski made a 34-yard field goal.  The Titans would answer as quarterback Vince Young completed a 56-yard touchdown pass to wide receiver Nate Washington, followed by a 43-yard field goal from kicker Rob Bironas.  Tennessee would add onto their lead in the second quarter as running back Javon Ringer 15-yard touchdown run, followed by running back Chris Johnson getting a 76-yard touchdown run.  The Raiders would close out the half with Janikowski's 30-yard field goal.

Oakland's deficit would increase in the third quarter as Johnson got a 4-yard touchdown run in the third quarter.  The Titans would  close out their dominating day in the fourth quarter as Young hooked up with tight end Bo Scaife on a 1-yard touchdown pass.  The Raiders would close out the game with quarterback Jason Campbell's 7-yard touchdown pass to running back Darren McFadden.

With the loss, Oakland began its season at 0–1.

Week 2: vs. St. Louis Rams

Hoping to rebound from their loss to the Titans the Raiders played on home ground for an interconference duel with the Rams. In the 2nd quarter the Raiders trailed early with QB Sam Bradford making a 7-yard TD pass to WR Mark Clayton. Then the Raiders replied with kicker Sebastian Janikowski nailing a 38-yard field goal; then he booted a 41-yard field goal in the third quarter. Then the Raiders fought back and took the lead when QB Bruce Gradkowski made a 4-yard TD pass to WR Louis Murphy, followed in the fourth quarter by Janikowski nailing a 22-yard field goal. The Rams cut the lead to 2 when Bradford found WR Mark Clayton on a 17-yard TD pass, but the Raiders' defense prevented anymore scoring.

With the win, the Raiders improved to 1–1.

Week 3: at Arizona Cardinals

Bruce Gradkowski came into the game as Oakland's starter at Quarterback, trying to cap on his gamewinning performance last week vs. St. Louis

Arizona started the game with a 102-yard kickoff return from LaRod Stephens-Howling. The Raiders answered quickly though when Gradkowski completed a 22-yard pass to tight-end Zach Miller. This was followed by three field goals, two for Oakland, one for Arizona, and Oakland led 13–10 at the end of the first quarter. Both Gradkowski and Derek Anderson then traded touchdowns and the Raiders led 20–17 at the half. Anderson helped Arizona take the lead late in the third quarter with an 8-yard touchdown pass to Larry Fitzgerald. Arizona led 24–20 at the end of the third quarter.

Sebastian Janikowski made the lead 24–23 with another field goal in the fourth quarter.

Arizona held on for the win after Janikowski missed a 32-yard field goal as time expired.

Both the Raiders and Cardinals committed numerous mistakes, including two muffed punts by Arizona. Oakland committed 11 penalties for 123 yards, Arizona seven for 104.

The Raiders fell to 1–2 with the loss.

Week 4: vs. Houston Texans

The Raiders' fourth game was an AFC duel with the Texans at home ground. The Raiders trailed early in the 1st quarter as RB Derrick Ward got a 33-yard TD run. The Raiders replied with RB Michael Bush making a 2-yard TD run. The Raiders fell behind again when QB Matt Schaub completed an 11-yard TD pass to TE Joel Dreessen. The Raiders responded in the 2nd quarter with QB Bruce Gradkowski getting a 13-yard TD pass to FB Marcel Reece. In the 3rd quarter the Texans started to rally with RB Arian Foster making a 74-yard TD run, followed by kicker Neil Rackers getting a 35-yard field goal, then in the 4th quarter Schaub threw a 10-yard TD pass to RB Arian Foster. The Raiders tried to fight back when Gradkowski found TE Zach Miller on a 14-yard TD pass, and then kicker Sebastian Janikowski nailed a 39-yard field goal, but the Texans' defense prevented any more chances.

With the loss, the Raiders fell to 1–3.

Week 5: vs. San Diego Chargers

The Raiders started the game with 12 unanswered points off of two blocked punts and a field goal. But San Diego quickly responded with a touchdown pass by Philip Rivers and a rush by Mike Tolbert. After the Raiders and Chargers traded field goals, the Chargers led, 17–15, after the first half.

Bruce Gradkowski was injured in the first half and after briefly starting the second half, he left the game. Jason Campbell relieved Gradkowski at the quarterback position for the rest of the game.

In the third quarter, The Chargers and Raiders traded touchdowns and heading into the fourth quarter the Raiders trailed, 24–22.

In the 4th, Nate Kaeding kicked a field goal early and extended the Chargers' lead to five, 27–22. The Raiders then capped off a 14-play, 73-yard drive with a rushing touchdown by Michael Bush, who took back the lead. After a failed two- point attempt by Oakland, they led, 28–27, with 3:24 remaining in the ballgame. The Chargers than began to drive trying to get themselves into field goal position to win the game. The Chargers eventually made it to the Raiders 23-yard line, but after a 10-yard holding penalty by the Chargers, San Diego faced a 2nd and 20 on Oakland's 33-yard line. Looking to pass, Rivers was stripped by Michael Huff and Tyvon Branch returned the fumble 64 yards for a touchdown, sealing the win for the Raiders, 35–27.

Though the Chargers outgained the Raiders, 506–279, their special teams were ultimately the deciding factor, giving up two blocked punts for a safety and touchdown. With the win the Raiders not only improved to 2–3, but also snapped a 13-game losing streak to the Chargers, with the first win over the Chargers since September 28, 2003.

Week 6: at San Francisco 49ers

Coming off their win over the Chargers the Raiders crossed the San Francisco-Oakland Bay Bridge to Candlestick Park where they played their San Francisco Bay rival, the 49ers. In the first quarter, the Raiders took the lead as kicker Sebastian Janikowski got a 27-yard field goal. Then he made a 24-yard field goal in the 2nd quarter. The 49ers replied with kicker Joe Nedney making a 25-yard field goal. The Raiders fell behind in the third quarter with QB Alex Smith making a 32-yard TD pass to WR Michael Crabtree. The Raiders cut the lead with Janikowski making a 40-yard field goal. The 49ers pulled away after Smith found TE Vernon Davis on a 17-yard TD pass.

With the loss, Oakland fell to 2–4.

Week 7: at Denver Broncos

The Raiders traveled to Denver for a week 7 AFC matchup for the ages. The game began with a 42-yard touchdown pass by Jason Campbell to tight-end Zach Miller to put the Raiders ahead 7–0 with 10:44 remaining in the first quarter. But only 8 seconds later, on the Broncos' first play from scrimmage, Kyle Orton threw an interception to Chris Johnson which was returned 30 yards for a touchdown. The Raiders now led 14–0 with 10:36 remaining. But then on the Broncos' next possession, Denver fumbled the ball, which was recovered by Oakland. The Raiders capitalized on the turnover with a 4-yard rushing touchdown by Darren McFadden. But the Raiders were not yet done, forcing the Broncos to a 4th down situation on their next drive and eventually making them turn the ball over on downs, adding a field goal to the score later in the quarter for the Raiders. At the end of the first quarter, Oakland led 24–0.

Oakland began the second quarter with a 19-yard touchdown pass from Jason Campbell to Darren McFadden to make the Raiders lead 31–0. Later in the quarter, McFadden again rushed for another touchdown, making the Raiders lead over the Broncos 38–0. But the Broncos would not give up, scoring a touchdown in the dying minutes of the first half when Kyle Orton hooked up with Knowshon Moreno in the end zone. At the end of the half, Oakland led 38–7.

Early in the second half, the Broncos again scored a touchdown and brought Oakland's lead down to just 38–14. But the Raiders weren't done scoring yet, scoring 21 unanswered points, including a 57-yard touchdown run by Darren McFadden. At the end of the third quarter, the Raiders led 59–14.

No scoring happened in the fourth quarter as the Raiders benched their starters. The Raiders defeated Denver 59–14. With the win, not only the Raiders improve to 3–4, they've set a new team record with 59 points scored and beat the Broncos for the third straight year in Denver.

Week 8: vs. Seattle Seahawks

Coming off their win over the Broncos the Raiders played on home ground where they played their former division rival, the Seattle Seahawks in their first matchup in Oakland since 2002. The Raiders took command with kicker Sebastian Janikowski nailing a 31-yard field goal. This was followed in the second quarter by QB Jason Campbell's 30-yard TD pass to FB Marcel Reece. Then in the third quarter Janikowski made a 36-yard field goal. Then he made a 22-yard field goal in the fourth quarter to put the Raiders up 16–0. The rally continued with Campbell getting a 69-yard TD pass to WR Darrius Heyward-Bey. The Seahawks would make their only score of the game with kicker Olindo Mare hitting a 47-yard field goal. However, the Raiders kept their momentum up as Janikowski made a 49-yard field goal, followed by RB Michael Bush making a 4-yard TD run.

With the win, Oakland improve to 4–4.

Week 9: vs. Kansas City Chiefs

At home, in front of a sellout crowd for the first time since their 2009 Home Opener, the Oakland Raiders battled the Kansas City Chiefs for control of the AFC West. The first score of the game came from the Chiefs as Matt Cassel threw an 11-yard touchdown pass to Verran Tucker to take a lead over the Raiders, 7–0. After a Ryan Succop field goal, the Chiefs led the Raiders 10–0 at the half.

The Raiders started the second half strong, as Jacoby Ford returned the opening kickoff 94 yards for a score and cut the Chiefs' lead to 10–7. After Succop kicked yet another field goal for the Chiefs, Oakland took the lead when Jason Campbell threw a 2-yard touchdown pass to Khalif Barnes. Going into the 4th Quarter, the Raiders led 14–13.

A fourth quarter Sebastian Janikowski field goal increased the Raiders' lead to 17–13. While the Raiders forced the Chiefs to punt on their next possession, punt-returner Nick Miller was charged with a controversial fumbling call. The play could not be challenged, as coach Tom Cable had used both of the Raiders' call challenges earlier in the game. On the Chiefs' ensuing drive, Cassel hooked up with Dwayne Bowe in the endzone to give the Chiefs a late 20–17 lead. In the dying seconds, the Raiders found themselves trailing until Campbell hooked up with Ford for a huge 41 yard reception setting Janikowski up for the game-tying field goal. The score tied the game at 20–20, sending it into overtime.

In overtime, the Raiders quickly forced the Chiefs to punt. On the Raiders' ensuing drive, Jason Campbell again hooked up with Jacoby Ford for a 47-yard pass completion. Sebastian Janikowski kicked a 31-yard field goal to give the Raiders an overtime win.

With the win, Oakland went into their bye week at 5–4 and snapped a seven-game home losing streak to the Chiefs. The Raiders' win also gave them their first three-game winning streak since 2002, as well as their first winning record, at any time during a season, since 2004.

Week 10: BYE

Week 11: at Pittsburgh Steelers

Coming off their bye week, the Raiders flew to Heinz Field for a Week 11 duel with the Pittsburgh Steelers.  Oakland delivered the game's opening punch in the first quarter with a 41-yard field goal from kicker Sebastian Janikowski.  The Steelers answered with running back Rashard Mendenhall getting a 5-yard touchdown run, followed by quarterback Ben Roethlisberger getting a 16-yard touchdown run, followed by his 22-yard touchdown pass to wide receiver Emmanuel Sanders.  After a scoreless third quarter, the Raiders' deficit increased in the fourth quarter as Roethlisberger completed a 52-yard touchdown pass to wide receiver Mike Wallace, followed by running back Isaac Redman getting a 16-yard touchdown pass.

There were several fights during the game, mentioned by the commentators as "reminiscent of the seventies" (the Raiders and Steelers were bitter rivals in the 1970s). The first incident came before the kickoff. Defensive tackle Richard Seymour was ejected from the game after punching Roethlisberger in the face through the facemask late in the first half.

With the loss, Oakland fell to 5–5.

Week 12: vs. Miami Dolphins

Hoping to rebound from their loss to the Steelers the Raiders played on home ground for an AFC duel with the Dolphins.
The Raiders took the early advantage as Jacoby Ford returned a kick-off 101 yards for a touchdown. However, they soon trailed with kicker Dan Carpenter nailing a 49-yard field goal, followed by QB Chad Henne completing a 29-yard TD pass to RB Patrick Cobbs. The Raiders replied as QB Bruce Gradkowski made a 44-yard TD pass to Ford. They fell behind as Carpenter got a 23-yard field goal, followed by Henne getting a 57-yard TD pass to WR Marlon Moore, and with Carpenter nailing a 44-yard field goal. The Raiders tried to cut the lead when kicker Sebastian Janikowski hit a 30-yard field goal, but the Dolphins pulled away with Carpenter getting a 25-yard field goal, and with RB Ricky Williams getting a 45-yard TD run.

With the loss, Oakland fell to 5–6.

Week 13: at San Diego Chargers

After losing two straight games, the Raiders looked to rebound at Qualcomm Stadium, facing a Chargers team coming off a big win at Indianapolis. The game started well for the Raiders; thanks to a muffed punt by Darren Sproles that was recovered by Hiram Eugene at the San Diego 18 yard line, and set up a 9-yard rushing touchdown by Jason Campbell. Scoring continued in the first quarter with a 4-yard pass from Campbell to Jacoby Ford; and gave the Raiders an early 14–0 lead over the Chargers.  The second quarter started with a 9-play, 48 yard drive that ended on a 39-yard field goal by Nate Kaeding, giving San Diego its first points of the game. Oakland answered with a rushing touchdown by Michael Bush, extending the lead to 21–3. The first half closed on a missed field goal by Kaeding.

The second half started with a quite calm third quarter, who saw both teams playing good defense and a Raiders team suffering with penalties. The third quarter closed with another field goal by Kaeding, nearing the Chargers on the scoreboard 21–6. The fourth quarter saw the Chargers trying to mount a comeback with a 4-yard TD pass from Philip Rivers to Antonio Gates; but it was promptly closed by a 7-play, 62 yard drive that ended with a Darren McFadden 7 yard rushing TD. With the win, both Raiders and Chargers reached a 6–6 record, and still stayed behind the Chiefs by 2 games for the division lead. The Raiders also swept the season series from the Chargers for the first time since 2001, and snapped a seven-game losing streak at Qualcomm Stadium.

The Raiders were favored by an impeding Chargers offense who struggled to control the game clock and establish a ground game; while the Raiders struggled with penalties and defensive miscues, mostly on the secondary.

Week 14: at Jacksonville Jaguars

Coming off their win over the Chargers the Raiders flew to EverBank Field for an AFC duel with the Jaguars. In the first quarter the Raiders took the lead as QB Jason Campbell completed a 67-yard TD pass to RB Darren McFadden. The Jaguars replied in the second quarter with QB David Garrard making a 1-yard TD pass to TE Marcedes Lewis. They increased their lead as kicker Sebastian Janikowski nailed a 26-yard field goal, followed by Campbell throwing an 8-yard TD pass to WR Louis Murphy. The lead was narrowed as Garrard made a 48-yard TD pass to WR Jason Hill. But the Raiders replied as McFadden ran 51 yards for a touchdown. They fell behind for the first time with RB Rashad Jennings getting a 74-yard TD run, followed by Garrard getting a 10-yard TD pass to WR Mike Sims-Walker, followed by Scobee nailing a 19-yard field goal. Oakland tied the game as McFadden got a 36-yard TD run, but the Jaguars pulled out the win with RB Maurice Jones-Drew getting a 30-yard TD run.

With the loss, Oakland fell to 6–7.

Week 15: vs. Denver Broncos

Hoping to rebound from their loss to the Jaguars the Raiders played in home ground for an AFC West rivalry rematch against the Broncos. The Raiders took the lead with Jacoby Ford running 71 yards for a touchdown. The Broncos replied as Tim Tebow scrambled 40 yards for a touchdown. The Raiders trailed as Tebow made a 33-yard TD pass to WR Brandon Lloyd. They soon responded by RB Michael Bush got a 1-yard TD run. The Broncos lead again with kicker Steven Hauschka making a 46-yard field goal, but the Raiders pulled ahead as kicker Sebastian Janikowski nailed a 49 and a 35-yard field goal. The Broncos re-tied the game after Hauschka made a 35-yard field goal, but the Raiders got the lead back with Janikowski nailing a 47-yard field goal, followed by QB Jason Campbell completing a 73-yard TD pass to FB Marcel Reece. The lead was narrowed when Hauschka nailed a 45-yard field goal, but the Raiders pulled away with OLB Quentin Groves tackling RB Correll Buckhalter in the endzone for a safety, followed by Bush getting a 1-yard TD run.

With the win, Oakland improved to 7–7.

Week 16: vs. Indianapolis Colts

The Raiders' fifteenth game was an AFC duel with the Colts at home. The Raiders struck immediately after a 99-yard kickoff return was made by Jacoby Ford. They soon trailed with RB Joseph Addai getting a 6-yard TD run, followed by kicker Adam Vinatieri getting a 30-yard field goal. They took the lead again after kicker Sebastian Janikowski hit a 59 and a 38-yard field goal, but trailed for the second time with QB Peyton Manning completing an 18-yard TD pass to TE Jacob Tamme. The Raiders tried to cut the lead with Janikowski nailing a 51-yard field goal, but fell further behind with Manning getting a 4-yard TD pass to WR Blair White. The Raiders tried to keep up with Janikowski making a 45-yard field goal, but the Colts kept going with Manning completing a 7-yard TD pass to WR Pierre Garçon. The Raiders tried to come back after QB Jason Campbell threw a 6-yard TD pass to TE Zach Miller, but the Colts defense prevented any more chances, giving them the loss.

With the loss, the Raiders fell to 7–8, and were officially eliminated from postseason contention for the eighth straight year.

Week 17: at Kansas City Chiefs

The Raiders' final game was an AFC West rivalry rematch against the Chiefs. They trailed early as kicker Ryan Succop nailed a 30-yard field goal, but overcame the deficit with QB Jason Campbell completing a 5-yard TD pass to WR Chaz Schilens, followed by kicker Sebastian Janikowski hitting a 38-yard field goal. The Chiefs tied the game with RB Jamaal Charles getting a 5-yard TD run, but the Raiders got the lead back with RB Michael Bush getting a 26-yard TD run, followed by Jacoby Ford getting a 10-yard TD run, then with CB Stanford Routt returning an interception 22 yards for a touchdown.

With the win, the Raiders finish the season with an 8–8 record, but not good enough to retain Tom Cable as head coach.  Not long after the regular season ended, the Raiders chose not to exercise their option to retain Cable, thus he was released from the Raider organization.

TV blackouts
The first four games of the season were blacked out for Oakland with crowds under 50,000, and a season low of just over 32,000 in a game against Houston. But, big wins against Denver and Seattle for the Raiders led to an increase in ticket sales for the Week 9 match-up against the Chiefs, which was sold out and was the only Raiders home game televised in the market in 2010 (ironically, the Chiefs are actually the Raiders' easternmost division rivals).

References

Oakland Raiders seasons
R00
Oakland
Oakland